Stabilimenti Industriali Farina (Turin, 1906–53) was an Italian automotive coachbuilder established by Giovanni Carlo Farina (1884–1957) in 12 Corso Tortona.

Among famous employees was his brother Battista Farina, who was here from the start in 1906 to 1928 before he in 1930 established what became Pininfarina. Pietro Frua worked here from 1928 to 1939 before starting his own company. Up until 1930, Felice Mario Boano was here and Giovanni Michelotti started his career with Farina in the mid-1930s. Also, Franco Martinengo and Alfredo Vignale were employed by Stabilimenti at the early stages of their careers.

Before  World War II, it did some Lancia Artena and Alfa Romeo 6C.   The founder retired in 1948, and the firm was run by his son Attilia Farina (1908–93).  At this time they made Fiat 1100/Fiat 1500 and the quite similar Simca 8. In 1950 Attili's brother Giuseppe Farina (1906–66) became the first world champion in Formula 1.

Stabilimenti Farina closed in 1953. Among the later builds were four Jowett Jupiters, ten  Ferrari 166 (some by Michelotti) and a Ferrari 212, before Ferrari in 1952 started its collaboration with Battista's  Pininfarina.

References

External links

 Coachbuild.com Encyclopedia: Stabilimenti Farina

Coachbuilders of Italy
Italian companies established in 1906
Turin motor companies